The 1999 Tamworth Borough Council election took place on 6 May 1999 to elect members of Tamworth Borough Council in Staffordshire, England. One third of the council was up for election and the Labour party stayed in overall control of the council.

After the election, the composition of the council was
Labour 27
Conservative 2
Independent 1

Background
Before the election Labour had a big majority on the council with 26 seats, compared to 1 Conservative and 1 independent, with a further 2 seats vacant. Councillors defending seats in the election included the only independent, Margaret Clarke, in Stonydelph and Labour's Phil Dix, who had first been elected in 1958, in Bolehall. 2 seats were being contested in Wilnecote ward after the resignation of councillor Ken Lewis.

Election result
The results had Labour easily keep control of the council, but with the Conservatives making 1 gain from Labour in Spital ward. The Conservative candidate, Ronald Cook, gained Spital by 201 votes over the Labour candidate.

Ward results

References

1999
1999 English local elections
1990s in Staffordshire